Urakaze  was one of 19 s built for the Imperial Japanese Navy during the 1930s.

Design and description
The Kagerō class was an enlarged and improved version of the preceding . Their crew numbered 240 officers and enlisted men. The ships had two Kampon geared steam turbines, each driving one propeller shaft, using steam provided by three Kampon water-tube boilers.

The main armament of the Kagerō class consisted of six Type 3  guns in three twin-gun turrets, one superfiring pair aft and one turret forward of the superstructure. They were built with four Type 96  anti-aircraft guns in two twin-gun mounts, but more of these guns were added over the course of the war. The ships were also armed with eight  torpedo tubes for the oxygen-fueled Type 93 "Long Lance" torpedo in two quadruple traversing mounts; one reload was carried for each tube. Their anti-submarine weapons comprised 16 depth charges.

Construction and career
On 9 June 1944, she rescued 126 survivors from the destroyer  (including her commander Lieutenant Commander Ikeda) which had been sunk by the submarine , near Tawitawi. During the Battle of Philippine Sea, she assisted survivors of the aircraft carrier , which was sunk by the submarine , and slightly damaged the attacking submarine with depth charges.

The torpedo that sank her was one out of three launched by the submarine, one of which inadvertently sank her with the two others missing their intended target, the battleship , and hitting the battleship , sinking her several hours later.

Notes

References

External links
  CombinedFleet.com: Kagero-class destroyers
  CombinedFleet.com: Urakaze history

Kagerō-class destroyers
World War II destroyers of Japan
Ships sunk by American submarines
1940 ships
World War II shipwrecks in the East China Sea
Ships lost with all hands
Maritime incidents in November 1944
Ships built by Fujinagata Shipyards